Prasanta may refer to

Prasanta Chandra Mahalanobis Mahavidyalaya, College in Kolkata
Prasanta Pradhan, Indian politician
Prasanta Banerjee, Indian footballer
Prasanta Sur, Indian politician
Prashanta Nanda, Indian politician
Prasanta Chatterjee, Indian politician
Prasanta Pattanaik, Professor in economics
Prasanta Chandra Mahalanobis, Indian scientist
Prasanta Karmakar, Indian swimmer
Prasanta Kumar Majumdar, Indian politician
Prasanta Bihari Mukharji, Indian judge

Indian given names